In philosophy, a razor is a principle or rule of thumb that allows one to eliminate ("shave off") unlikely explanations for a phenomenon, or avoid unnecessary actions.

Razors include:
Alder's razor (also known as Newton's Flaming Laser Sword): If something cannot be settled by experiment or observation, then it is not worthy of debate.
Einstein's razor: "The supreme goal of all theory is to make the irreducible basic elements as simple and as few as possible without having to surrender the adequate representation of a single datum of experience." Often paraphrased as "make things as simple as possible, but no simpler."
Grice's razor (also known as Giume's razor): As a principle of parsimony, conversational implications are to be preferred over semantic context for linguistic explanations.
Hanlon's razor: Never attribute to malice that which can be adequately explained by stupidity.
Hitchens's razor: That which can be asserted without evidence can be dismissed without evidence.
Hume's guillotine: What ought to be cannot be deduced from what is. "If the cause, assigned for any effect, be not sufficient to produce it, we must either reject that cause, or add to it such qualities as will give it a just proportion to the effect."
Occam's razor: Simpler explanations are more likely to be correct; avoid unnecessary or improbable assumptions.
Popper's falsifiability principle: For a theory to be considered scientific, it must be falsifiable.
Russell's teapot: Is an analogy, formulated by the philosopher Bertrand Russell (1872–1970), to illustrate that the philosophic burden of proof lies upon a person making empirically unfalsifiable claims, rather than shifting the burden of disproof to others. He wrote that if he were to assert, without offering proof, that a teapot, too small to be seen by telescopes, orbits the Sun somewhere in space between the Earth and Mars, he could not expect anyone to believe him solely because his assertion could not be proven wrong.
Sagan standard: Extraordinary claims require extraordinary evidence.

See also

References

Razors
Arguments
Philosophical analogies
Rhetorical techniques